This is an index of lists of ship launches by year.